Zhu Qi (born May 1942) was a general of the Chinese People's Liberation Army. He formerly served as commander of the Beijing Military Region.

Biography 
Zhu Qi is from Xiangyun County, Yunnan, China. He graduated from the Central Party School of the Chinese Communist Party with a degree in economic administration.

In January 1960 he entered the Chinese People's Liberation Army. In August 1961 he entered the Chinese Communist Party.

Zhu Qi took part in high-level talks between U.S. and Chinese military officials as part of the Sanye Initiative organized by the East West Institute from June 16 to 19, 2012. Delegates covered topics including U.S. arms sales to Taiwan and managing military relationships.

History 

From January 1960 to June 1964, squad leader and company clerk
From June 1964 to June 1965, squad leader and battalion secretary
From June 1965 to June 1971, staff officer, operations and training section, regimental command department
From June 1971 to October 1979, assistant chief and chief, operations and training section, division command department
From October 1979 to October 1981, deputy chief of staff, division command division
From October 1981 to July 1984, regiment commander (from September 1982 to July 1984 completed studies at the PLA Military Academy)
From July 1984 to November 1984, division deputy commander
From November 1984 to August 1985, division commander
From August 1985 to April 1989, army chief of staff
From April 1989 to June 1990, army deputy commander
From June 1990 to March 1994, commander of the Guizhou province military area
From March 1994 to January 1996, commander of [an unknown] army
From January 1996 to March 1998, chief of staff for the Chengdu Military Region
From March 1998 to January 2002, chief of staff for the Beijing Military Region.
From January 2002 to 2007, commander of the Beijing Military Region.

GEN Zhu Qi was promoted to MGEN in July 1990, LTGEN July 1997, and GEN in June 2004.
A member of the 16th National People's Congress

References 

1942 births
Living people
People from Dali
Central Party School of the Chinese Communist Party alumni
People's Liberation Army generals from Yunnan
Members of the Standing Committee of the 11th National People's Congress
Members of the 16th Central Committee of the Chinese Communist Party
Chinese Communist Party politicians from Yunnan
People's Republic of China politicians from Yunnan